The Belgian railway line 130 is a railway line in Belgium connecting Namur and Charleroi. Completed in 1843, the line runs 36.6 km. It runs along the river Sambre, crossing it several times.

Stations
The main interchange stations on line 130 are:

Namur: to Brussels, Luxembourg City, Dinant and Liège
Jemeppe-sur-Sambre: to Gembloux
Charleroi-Sud: to Brussels, Ottignies, Couvin, Erquelinnes and Mons

References

130
Railway lines opened in 1843
3000 V DC railway electrification